Gordon Ryder (1919–2000) OBE was a modernist architect and co-founder with Peter Yates of Ryder and Yates, known for designing a number of modernist buildings in the north-east of England in the 1960s. Ryder studied architecture at Newcastle University School of Architecture, Planning & Landscape (then King's College, Durham) then in 1948 began working for Berthold Lubetkin on the designs for Peterlee new town.

In 1953, he formed Ryder and Yates with Peter Yates, who had also worked with Lubetkin at Peterlee, one of the first multi-disciplinary practices that integrated architecture and engineering. Key projects were two buildings for Northern Gas in Killingworth; the Northern Gas Board offices built in 1963 and subsequently the Gas Council Engineering Research Station (1966-7), "a cool Corbusian building of white concrete", which won the Financial Times' industrial architecture award in 1968, and a Royal Institute of British Architects award the following year. Both are now Grade II listed. Otherp projects included social housing at North Kenton and major buildings for the Salvation Army, Tyne Tees Television and Vickers Armaments.

'Trees', a private house built in Woolsington, Newcastle upon Tyne in 1967–68, was listed Grade II in 2010. In 2015, MEA House and Ryder & Yates' own offices in Killingworth were listed Grade II, with the architects offices subsequently being removed from the register after a change of heart by the government minister in 2016.

References 

Modernist architects from England
1919 births
2000 deaths
Alumni of Newcastle University
20th-century English architects